Mulena Yomuhulu Mbumu wa Litunga Mwanasolundwi Muyunda Mumbo wa Mulonga was a mythical ruler, High chief of the Lozi people in Zambia, Africa.

He was a king of Lozi and demigod, one of the sacred high chiefs of Barotseland.

Biography
His father was god Nyame and his mother was mortal queen named Mbuymamwambwa, a daughter of Mwambwa. He was a stepson of goddess Asase Ya.

He was chosen as the first male ruler of the Lozi and extended his realm by conquering the ba-Mishulundu, ba-Namale, ba-Mulinga, ba-Upangoma, ba-Liuwa, ba-Muenyi and the Mambowe.

His wife was Chiefess Malundwelo.

He died at Ikatulamwa and is buried there.

References

Litungas